Dalyala (Dhalyala) is a village found in Azad Kashmir in the Khari Sharif area of Pakistan it is composed mostly of Sohlan Rajputs. They are said to be of Panwar Rajput descent which is a sub-branch of the Paramara Rajputs. The village name is derived from the dhall, a type of shield used in medieval warfare. The population of this village is approximately 900. Some of the residents are currently residing in the United Kingdom, France, Greece, Hong Kong and Dubai.

Geography and climate 
Dhalyala is located at  (32.900000, 73.750000) and lies at an altitude of 246 metres (818 ft) above sea-level.

The village as a whole has a moderate climate. In summer, temperatures can reach 43 °C, but the hot spells are comparatively short. The winter months are very pleasant with temperatures rarely falling below 1 °C.

History 
The ancient history of the region has seen it participate in the Indus Valley civilization and the Gandhara Civilization. At a later date, the Battle of the Hydaspes took place nearby, between the armies of Alexander the Great and the Indian king Porus.

Sites of interest 
The village lies between the ancient town of Sarai Alamgir and Mirpur. Nearby are the sites of the Jagu Head, Mangla Dam, Jhelum River, and the huge Rohtas Fort.

Author: Raja Mohammad Shamshad Sharif (S/O Raja Mohammad Sharif of Dhalyala)  resident in Hemel Hempstead, UK

References 

Populated places in Mirpur District